The Ranger Russet is a late-maturing potato that is used for baking and processing into fries. It was originally bred by Joseph J. Pavek of the USDA in Aberdeen, Idaho, and released jointly by the USDA and the agricultural stations of Idaho, Washington, Oregon and Colorado in 1991. Ranger Russet is not under plant variety protection. It yields medium to high numbers of tubers with a short dormancy period.

Botanical Features 

 The Ranger Russet plant is medium to tall in height and semi-erect with single, wavy, very prominent wings. 
 The stems are slightly pigmented and the non-pigmented nodes are slightly swollen. 
 The open, medium green leaves have weakly pigmented midribs. 
 Primary leaflets appear in four pairs with a narrowly ovate shape, an acuminate tip, an obtuse and symmetrical base and weakly wavy margins. Terminal leaflets also appear in four pairs with a narrowly ovate shape and an acuminate tip but the base is obtuse and asymmetrical. 
 Sprouts are broad with a cylindrical shape; the base is medium red-violet and strongly pubescent while the apex is weakly pigmented and moderately pubescent. 
 There are numerous flowers that have a medium red-violet corolla and a lemon yellow anther. The flower buds are strongly pigmented. 
 Tubers are long with a slightly flattened shape. 
 The brown russet skin has evenly distributed medium deep eyes with slightly prominent eyes. 
 The flesh is white. 
 Tubers have high specific gravity.

Agricultural Features 

 This variety has a high resistance to heat necrosis, hollow heart (hollowed center of potato), Verticillium wilt, PVY, and PVX. 
 It has moderate resistance to early blight, common scab, leafroll, and Fusarium dry rot. 
 It is moderately susceptible to growth cracks.
 Ranger Russet is very susceptible to late blight and root-knot nematode.

Storage 
Ranger Russet has a dormancy period of approximately 100 days when stored at 45 F. This means if the potatoes are being stored to be used as seed they must be kept about 7-9 degrees cooler in order to prevent excessive sprouting and aging. Potatoes that are in storage to be used for processing can be stored in the same type of conditions that Russet Burbank can be stored at. If the potatoes are in storage for more than three months a chemical sprout inhibitor should be applied before 90th day. If the potatoes are immature or damaged fusarium dry rot can become an issue. It is also important that the storage unit is at a high humidity level to reduce the risk of pressure bruise.

References

Potato cultivars